Mauno Olavi Laiho (1907 – 2 September 1944) was the last Finn to be executed in Finland.

Early life
Olavi Laiho was born the son of a farmhand in Halikko, Finland. He was introduced to communism very early on, and was an active member of the underground Finnish Communist Party. He moved to Turku, where he worked as a construction worker. Laiho was active in sports.

Military service
During the Continuation War, Laiho was conscripted into the Finnish Army as a private. Laiho deserted and moved to a clandestine hideaway near Turku, where he worked actively as a spy for the Soviet Union and as an aide for other deserters.

Capture, trial and execution

Laiho was caught in early 1944 and sentenced to death by military court for desertion, espionage and high treason. He was shot by military police firing squad on 2 September 1944 in Oulu, two days before the armistice. Although the Finnish Military Code mandated a death penalty for espionage and treason, it is likely his communist background ultimately influenced his sentence.

Laiho was the last Finn to be executed in Finland, and the last Finn to be executed for a military crime. A group of three Soviet infiltrators were shot on the following day for espionage. The armistice on 4 September 1944 put a moratorium on any further executions. In 1945, all death sentences were commuted to life imprisonment.

The death penalty for military crimes was abolished in Finland in 1972.

References 

1907 births
1944 deaths
People from Salo, Finland
People from Turku and Pori Province (Grand Duchy of Finland)
Communist Party of Finland politicians
1944 in Finland
Finnish soldiers
People executed by Finland by firing squad
Executed Finnish people
Executed spies
Finnish spies for the Soviet Union
World War II spies for the Soviet Union
People convicted of spying for the Soviet Union
People executed for desertion
20th-century executions by Finland